Oerlikon Velodrome is an uncovered velodrome in the Oerlikon district of Zürich, Switzerland. It was built in 1912. The track is 333 m in length and is made of concrete. The velodrome holds 3000 spectators. It held the UCI Track Cycling World Championships in 1923, 1929, 1936, 1946, 1953, 1961 and 1983.

Velodromes in Switzerland
Sports venues in Zürich
Sports venues completed in 1912
20th-century architecture in Switzerland